El Parco is a district of Bagua Province, Peru.

References

Districts of the Bagua Province
Districts of the Amazonas Region